India' participated in the 2009 World Championships in Athletics held at Berlin from 15–23 August. Six Indian athletes had qualified for the Championships, but none of them won any medal. Only Babubhai Panucha, who competed in the 20 km walk category managed to establish a new National record clocking a time of 1:23:06 beating his own previous record time.

Athletics Federation of India had sent a team of six athletes for the competition, which is ranked only next to the Olympics and the FIFA World Cup in terms of popularity as a major global sporting event. Selected athletes have achieved one of the competition's qualifying standards.

Team selection

Track and road events

Field and combined events

Results

Men

Women

References

External links
Official competition website

Nations at the 2009 World Championships in Athletics
World Championships in Athletics
2009